Iron(II) chloride, also known as ferrous chloride, is the chemical compound of formula FeCl2.  It is a paramagnetic solid with a high melting point.  The compound is white, but typical samples are often off-white.  FeCl2 crystallizes from water as the greenish tetrahydrate, which is the form that is most commonly encountered in commerce and the laboratory. There is also a dihydrate. The compound is highly soluble in water, giving pale green solutions.

Production

Hydrated forms of ferrous chloride are generated by treatment of wastes from steel production with hydrochloric acid.  Such solutions are designated "spent acid," or "pickle liquor" especially when the hydrochloric acid is not completely consumed:
Fe  +  2 HCl  →   FeCl2  +  H2
The production of ferric chloride involves the use of ferrous chloride.  Ferrous chloride is also a byproduct from the production of titanium, since some titanium ores contain iron.

Anhydrous FeCl2
Ferrous chloride is prepared by addition of iron powder to a solution of hydrochloric acid in methanol. This reaction gives the methanol solvate of the dichloride, which upon heating in a vacuum at about 160 °C converts to anhydrous FeCl2.  The net reaction is shown:
 Fe  +  2 HCl  →  FeCl2  +  H2
FeBr2 and FeI2 can be prepared analogously.

An alternative synthesis of anhydrous ferrous chloride is the reduction of FeCl3 with chlorobenzene:
2 FeCl3  +  C6H5Cl   →   2 FeCl2  +  C6H4Cl2  +  HCl

For the preparation of ferrocene ferrous chloride is generated in situ by comproportionation of FeCl3 with iron powder in tetrahydrofuran (THF).  Ferric chloride decomposes to ferrous chloride at high temperatures.

Hydrates
The dihydrate, FeCl2(H2O)2, crystallizes from concentrated hydrochloric acid.  The dihydrate is a coordination polymer.  Each Fe center is coordinated to four doubly bridging chloride ligands.  The octahedron is completed by a pair of mutually trans aquo ligands.

Reactions

FeCl2 and its hydrates form complexes with many ligands. For example, solutions of the hydrates react with two molar equivalents of [(C2H5)4N]Cl to give the salt [(C2H5)4N]2[FeCl4].

The anhydrous FeCl2, which is soluble in THF, is a standard precursor in organometallic synthesis. FeCl2 is used to generate NHC complexes in situ for cross coupling reactions.

Applications
Unlike the related ferrous sulfate and ferric chloride, ferrous chloride has few commercial applications.  Aside from use in the laboratory synthesis of iron complexes, ferrous chloride serves as a coagulation and flocculation agent in wastewater treatment, especially for wastes containing chromate or sulfides.  It is used for odor control in wastewater treatment. It is used as a precursor to make various grades of hematite that can be used in a variety of pigments. It is the precursor to hydrated iron(III) oxides that are magnetic pigments.  FeCl2 finds some use as a reagent in organic synthesis.

Natural occurrence
Lawrencite, (Fe,Ni)Cl2, is the natural counterpart, and a typically (though rarely occurring) meteoritic mineral. The natural form of the dihydrate is rokühnite - a very rare mineral. Related, but more complex (in particular, basic or hydrated) minerals are hibbingite, droninoite and kuliginite.

References

See also
 Iron(III) chloride
 Iron(II) sulfate

Chlorides
Iron(II) compounds
Metal halides